Erdinç Aslan (born 8 May 1968) is a Turkish weightlifter. He competed at the 1992 Summer Olympics and the 1996 Summer Olympics.

References

External links
 

1968 births
Living people
Turkish male weightlifters
Olympic weightlifters of Turkey
Weightlifters at the 1992 Summer Olympics
Weightlifters at the 1996 Summer Olympics
Place of birth missing (living people)
20th-century Turkish people